An Oscar party is any of the several parties, usually held by entertainment-media corporations, immediately following the broadcast of the Academy Awards ceremony. Some sponsors, such as Vanity Fair, are known for holding such a party every year, and the influence of the sponsor can be roughly measured by the caliber of the celebrities that attend their party. In recent years, many of these events have adopted a charitable theme, such as the Elton John AIDS Foundation Academy Award Party.

External links
Let's Celeb Rate! At the Oscar Parties, a Chance to Rub Elbows -- and Eyeballs -- With the Stars
Extra - DAILY NEWS - Oscar Parties

 Oscar Party 2015 

Academy Awards